Carenum scaritoides is a species of ground beetle in the subfamily Scaritinae. It was described by Westwood in 1843.

References

scaritoides
Beetles described in 1843